The Global Tag League is a professional wrestling round-robin tag team tournament held by Pro Wrestling Noah. It was created in 2008.

The Global Tag League is held under a points system, with two points for a win, one for a time limit draw and none for any other kind of a draw or a loss. The team finishing atop the points standings are the winners. Matches in the Global Tag League have a 30-minute time limit, which is the same as matches for Noah's GHC Tag Team Championship.

In the below results,  signifies the GHC Tag Team Champions at the time of each tournament.

List of winners

2008
The 2008 Global Tag League featured nine teams, and was held from March 29 to April 27.

2009
The 2009 Global Tag League featured eight teams, and was held from April 11 to May 6.

2010
The 2010 Global Tag League ran from January 9 through January 24. It was the first edition of the Global Tag League featuring a block system, with eight teams in two blocks of four. The top finishing teams from each block met in the final.

2011
The 2011 Global Tag League ran from April 16 to April 29 in the tournament's original round-robin format.

2012
The 2012 Global Tag League ran from April 11 to April 29 in the tournament's original round-robin format.

2013
The 2013 Global Tag League ran from April 13 through April 28. The 2013 edition was only the second to feature two blocks of teams; each consisting of five, with the top teams from each block meeting in the final. Naomichi Marufuji was sidelined with a knee injury on April 14 after his and Takashi Sugiura's first match, a win over Shinya Ishikawa and Yoshihito Sasaki, had already taken place. On April 17, Noah announced that Atsushi Kotoge would replace Marufuji in the tournament, but instead of inheriting Marufuji's and Sugiura's points, they would start at zero points and face Ishikawa and Sasaki in a new match.

2014
The 2014 Global Tag League ran from April 12 through April 27.

2015
The 2015 Global Tag League ran from April 19 through May 4. Takeshi Morishima was scheduled to enter the tournament, but was forced to pull out due to injury and was replaced by Super Crazy.

2016
The 2016 Global Tag League took place between April 21 and May 4.

2017
The 2017 Global Tag League took place from April 22 to May 4. On April 26, the team of Bram and Robbie E was removed from the league with the two forfeiting the rest of their matches, due to controversial Instagram posts made by Bram.

2018
The 2018 Global Tag League took place from March 18 to April 11.

2019
The 2019 Global Tag League took place from April 6 to May 5.

2020
The 2020 Global Tag League took place from April 4 to April 18.

See also

World Tag League
World's Strongest Tag Determination League
Ultimate Tag League
Furinkazan

References

External links
 Pro Wrestling NOAH (NOAH) Tournaments

Pro Wrestling Noah
Pro Wrestling Noah tournaments
Pro Wrestling Noah shows